Lerheimia is a genus of chironomid midges containing four described species found in Tanzania and the Democratic Republic of the Congo.

These are small chironomids (wing length 0.8 - 1.3 mm) with bare, protruding eyes, and distinctive wing venation with extended costa and down-curved anal vein.

References
Lerheimia, a new genus of Orthocladiinae from Africa (Diptera: Chironomidae)

Chironomidae
Nematocera genera